Cochylidia oblonga is a species of moth of the family Tortricidae. It is found in China (Anhui, Fujian, Gansu, Guangdong, Guangxi, Henan, Hubei, Hunan, Jiangxi, Liaoning, Tianjin).

The ground colour of the forewings is yellowish white, the costal margin with a narrow brownish black stripe running from the base to the median fascia. The hindwings are pale grey.

References

External links

Moths described in 2012
Endemic fauna of China
Cochylini